The Helsinki commuter rail system comprises four local and four regional services, each of which are identified by letters of the alphabet.

Letters have been used as service identifiers since 1972. This was originally inspired by the Copenhagen S-train system. Unlike Copenhagen, which maintains a strict alphabetical order, letters of Helsinki commuter rail services are often assigned on the basis of mnemonics, such as E for Espoo and K for Kerava, with care taken to ensure that the original letters did not sound or look similar, to avoid confusion.

Commuter train services operate on four railway lines, radiating from the Helsinki Central Station:

 westbound on the Coastal Line (and )
 northbound on the Ring Rail Line (/, separating from the Main Line after Hiekkaharju station)
 northbound on the Main Line

The VR commuter rail system consists of three local and four interurban services:

 The  runs northbound from Helsinki on the Main Line, but separates on to the Lahti Line to run northeast just after Kerava.
 The  forms Tampere's commuter rail. It runs from Nokia to  Tampere, with some services extending to Toijala. As of August 2022, this now runs hourly throughout the day, with roughly two-hourly extensions to Toijala .
 The  runs hourly from Lahti to Riihimäki. 
 The  runs mainly from Kotka Port to Kouvola, with some services running between Lahti and Kouvola/Kotka.

Current lines
The trains per hour are for weekdays only.

Special lines
Special lines are lines that do not run regularly, and are usually not listed (explicitly or even at all) on the HSL/VR map. These include the lines to Siuntio, Kouvola and Tampere.

Lines not terminating in Helsinki
These lines have both termini outside of the HSL area and include all lines from the VR commuter rail system. 

 The  train runs from Nokia to Tampere and Toijala. It is Tampere's sole commuter rail line.
 The  train runs from Riihimäki to Lahti.
 The  train runs from Lahti to Kouvola/Kotkan satama and Kouvola to Kotkan satama.

References
All cited material is in Finnish only unless stated otherwise.

Regional rail in Finland
Transport in Helsinki
1969 establishments in Finland